Dondar Quşçu (also, Dondar-Kushchu) is a village and municipality in the Tovuz Rayon of Azerbaijan.  It has a population of 3,482.

References 

Populated places in Tovuz District